Wyszyna may refer to the following places:
Wyszyna, Greater Poland Voivodeship (west-central Poland)
Wyszyna, Masovian Voivodeship (east-central Poland)
Wyszyna, Choszczno County in West Pomeranian Voivodeship (north-west Poland)
Wyszyna, Myślibórz County in West Pomeranian Voivodeship (north-west Poland)